Adelpha alala, the Alala sister, is a species of butterfly of the family Nymphalidae. It is found in South America.

Subspecies
Listed alphabetically:
A. a. alala
A. a. completa Fruhstorfer, 1907
A. a. negra (C. & R. Felder, 1862)
A. a. titia Fruhstorfer, 1915

References

Adelpha
Nymphalidae of South America
Butterflies described in 1847
Taxa named by William Chapman Hewitson